Hillman is an unincorporated community in Gallatin County, in the U.S. state of Montana.

History
The community was named in honor of A. J. Hilman, a railroad agent who had previously lived in the area.

References

Unincorporated communities in Gallatin County, Montana
Unincorporated communities in Montana